Jacques Brautbar (born March 14, 1979) is an American composer, photographer, producer, writer and guitarist, formerly of rock band Phantom Planet.  He left the band in 2004, after their self-titled third album, to pursue a career in photography. Brautbar's photo credits include Rolling Stone, Spin, Nylon, Jane and High Times magazines.

In the spring of 2006, Brautbar returned to music and began to play shows with Beck, OK Go, UH HUH HER, Jack's Mannequin and the electronica band Something for Rockets. Brautbar toured with Something for Rockets for over a year and is a co-writer on their second record. Brautbar has since moved on from the band to explore music composition and production.

In 2008, Brautbar began writing music for film and television and co-writing with other artists. He most recently co-produced and co-wrote the forthcoming album Beneath The Noise for Jasmine Ash, with longtime collaborator and former bandmate Sam Farrar. The album has already achieved sync success on several hit TV shows and ad campaigns like Nissan, Apple, JC Penney, Macy's, and The Good Wife.

Throughout a career spanning more than twenty-five years, Jacques Brautbar has enjoyed professional success across the major pillars of music creativity: Performance, Songwriting and Production, and Scoring to Picture for Film and Television.

Born and raised in Los Angeles, Jacques began his professional music career at the age of fifteen as founder, guitar player, arranger, and songwriter for Sony recording artist Phantom Planet. While a full-time band member, Jacques collaborated on the three pivotal singles: "Lonely Day," "Big Brat," and the theme song to the hit show The O.C, "California." He also accompanied the band on their American, European, and World tours, as well as frequent television performances for Jay Leno, Co-nan O'Brien and David Letterman. 

After a decade with Phantom Planet, Jacques signed a coveted publishing deal with Sony/ATV Pub-lishing. During this production bootcamp, he penned and produced hundreds of songs––from Hip-Hop to Pop to Country––alongside talents like Julia Michaels, Rachel Platton, and numerous oth-ers, landing dozens of high-profile syncs for NBC, Ferrero Rochet, and Apple, just to name a few. It was during this time that he recognized a desire to delve deeper into his craft and complete his music degree at the Thornton School of Music. 

While immersing himself in the Bachelor of Arts Music curriculum, actively studying, collaborat-ing, and completing directed research in music pedagogy with the Chris Sampson, Jacques was granted a final project guest lecturing position. The educational experience at the University of Southern California––especially in post-career adulthood––helped Jacques finalize his trajectory as he uncov-ered a passion for writing narrative music and set his sights on the prestigious Scoring for Motion Picture and Television graduate program at the Thornton School. 

After successfully completing the SMPTV program, Jacques was selected to attended the distinguished Sundance Institute's Composer Lab  at Skywalker ranch, and procured an additional music position for the HBO series, "Animals." Jacques has since worked as an additional writer for Netflix's, "Insatiable,"and Amazon's "Lorena"and "Absentia." In 2016 Jacques attended Sundance with the documentary "Bad Reputation" and was slated to appear at South by South West in 2020 with his film "For Madmen Only." In 2020 Jacques delivered an original full score on the Blumhouse/Amazon horror series "Welcome to the Blumhouse." Most recenty, Jacques scored the Tribeca Film Festival breakout hit, "It Ain't Over," and is wrapping his first television series for Discovery plus.

References

External links
 Official website
 

1979 births
American photographers
American rock guitarists
American male guitarists
Living people
Artists from Los Angeles
Phantom Planet members
21st-century American guitarists
21st-century American male musicians